Philippines competed at the 1991 World Championships in Athletics in Tokyo, Japan, from August 23 to September 1, 1991. The Philippines fielded 2 athletes who competed in 2 events.

Results

Men
Field events

Women
Track and road events

References

Nations at the 1991 World Championships in Athletics
1991
World Championships in Athletics